Chaykovsky (masculine), Chaykovskaya (feminine), or Chaykovskoye (neuter) is the name of several inhabited localities in Russia.

Urban localities
Chaykovsky, Perm Krai, a town in Perm Krai

Rural localities
Chaykovsky, Krasnoyarsk Krai, a settlement in Chaykovsky Selsoviet of Bogotolsky District in Krasnoyarsk Krai
Chaykovskoye, Republic of Crimea, a selo in Simferopolsky District of the Republic of Crimea
Chaykovskoye, Kaliningrad Oblast, a settlement in Mozyrsky Rural Okrug of Pravdinsky District in Kaliningrad Oblast
Chaykovskaya, a settlement at the station in Nytvensky District of Perm Krai

See also
Chaykovskogo, a settlement in Klinsky District of Moscow Oblast